Achaeus is a masculine given name. It may refer to:

People
 Achaeus of Eretria (born 484 BC), tragic poet
 Achaeus of Syracuse (4th century BC), tragic poet
 Achaeus (son of Seleucus I Nicator) (3rd century BC), Greek Macedonian nobleman
 Achaeus (general) (died 213 BC), ruler of part of the Greek Seleucid kingdom

Mythological figures
 Achaeus (mythology), three figures in Greek mythology

See also
 Achaius, one of the legendary kings of Scotland

Greek masculine given names